The January 2010 Kabul attack was a suicide bombing and gun attack which occurred in central Kabul, Afghanistan for several hours on 18 January 2010. Taliban gunmen attacked the Presidential Palace and several government buildings. Two shopping centres, two cinemas and a bank were also targeted by the attackers. Twelve people were killed in the attack: two civilians, three members of security forces and seven Taliban fighters (at least two of whom were suicide bombers); 71 other people were wounded. According to a statement on a Taliban website, the nearby Kabul Serena Hotel and government buildings were the intended target for the attack and that 20 of their members committed the attack.

See also
 List of massacres in Afghanistan

References

2010 murders in Afghanistan
January attack
January 2010 attack
21st-century mass murder in Afghanistan
Attacks on bank buildings
Attacks on buildings and structures in 2010
January 2010 attack
Attacks on cinemas
Attacks on government buildings and structures
Attacks on hotels in Asia
January 2010 crimes
January 2010 events in Afghanistan
Mass murder in 2010
January 2010 attack
Attacks on shopping malls
Suicide bombings in 2010
January 2010 attack
January 2010 attack
Terrorist incidents in Afghanistan in 2010
War in Afghanistan (2001–2021)
Building bombings in Afghanistan
Hotel bombings
Shopping mall bombings